Bolon Island Tideways State Scenic Corridor is a state park in the U.S. state of Oregon, administered by the Oregon Parks and Recreation Department. The  park is on Bolon Island 10 river miles (16 km) from the mouth of the Umpqua River and north of Reedsport. It is along Highway 101 and near the site, where in 1828, most of Jedediah Smith's party were massacred. The land was given to the state in 1934 by William C. and Jennie D. Chamberlain.

The park is undeveloped except for a parking area and a  hiking trail.

See also
 List of Oregon state parks

References

External links
 

State parks of Oregon
Parks in Douglas County, Oregon